Shorewood Hills may refer to:

Shorewood Hills, Arkansas
 Shorewood Hills, Wisconsin